Mr. Chump is a 1938 American musical comedy film directed by William Clemens and written by George Bricker. The film stars Johnnie Davis, Lola Lane, Penny Singleton, Donald Briggs, Chester Clute and Frank Orth. The film was released by Warner Bros. on August 8, 1938.

Plot
Small-town layabout Bill "Scats" Small is a whiz at figuring out the stock market, but he has no money to actually invest in it. He prefers not to do any actual work and is happier just playing his trumpet, annoying the family he rooms with. Eventually, he gets a job with a touring band, but when next he returns home, he finds himself in a hotbed of romantic and larcenous intrigue and has to use all his wiles to clean up both messes.

Cast        
Johnnie Davis as Bill Small
Lola Lane as Jane Mason
Penny Singleton as Betty Martin
Donald Briggs as Jim Belden
Chester Clute as Ed Mason
Frank Orth as Sheriff Frank Hinton
Granville Bates as Abner Sprague
Spencer Charters as Mr. Koeper

References

External links
 

1938 films
American comedy films
1938 comedy films
Warner Bros. films
Films directed by William Clemens
American black-and-white films
1930s English-language films
1930s American films